Chiman may refer to:
Chiman people, an ethnic group of Bolivia
Chiman language, a language of Bolivia
Chimán, a town in Panama
 Chimán District
Çimən, a village in Azerbaijan

Language and nationality disambiguation pages